Kim Rae-won (Korean: 김래원; born 19 March 1981) is a South Korean actor. He first rose to fame with his appearances in the 2003 romantic comedy series Cats on the Roof, and movies such as My Little Bride (2004), Sunflower (2006), The Prison (2017), TV series Love Story in Harvard (2004), Gourmet (2008), A Thousand Days' Promise (2011), Punch (2014–2015), Doctors (2016), and Black Knight: The Man Who Guards Me (2018).

Career
Kim Rae-won initially wanted to become a professional basketball player, but when an injured ankle tendon ended that childhood dream, he turned to acting and studied Theater and Film at Chung-Ang University. He made his acting debut in the 1997 teen drama  Me, in the role of a newbie at the broadcasting club of his high school. This was followed by another teen drama, School 2 (1999) and coming-of-age film Plum Blossom (2000).

In 2002, Kim rose to fame after starring in the romance comedy drama My Love Patzzi. His popularity further increased in 2003, playing a law student slacker who cohabitates with a girl (Jeong Da-bin) in the popular romance series Cats on the Roof. He then played a carefree photographer who enters the life of an introverted girl in melodrama ...ing and starred in the romantic comedy film My Little Bride, in the role of a college graduate forced to marry a high school girl (Moon Geun-young). My Little Bride became a sleeper hit and was the second top-grossing Korean film of 2004.

Kim continued playing romantic heroes on television, in dramas such as Snowman (2003), Love Story in Harvard (2004), and Which Star Are You From (2006). But on the big screen, he focused on darker, more masculine fare. He played a lowlife-turned-cop in Mr. Socrates (2005), a former gangster attempting to turn over a new leaf in Sunflower (2006), and an antihero art restorer in Insadong Scandal (2009).

In 2008, Kim played an elementary school teacher who falls for a Korean-Japanese jewelry designer (Mirai Yamamoto) in the Japanese film . Later that year, he starred as a genius aspiring chef in Gourmet, a hit series based on Huh Young-man's manhwa Sikgaek.

Kim then explored the melodrama genre in A Thousand Days' Promise (2011), by renowned TV screenwriter Kim Soo-hyun. Kim impressed the audience with his portrayal of a character torn between the longtime girlfriend whom his parents approve of, and the woman he truly loves (Soo Ae) who suffers from early-onset Alzheimer's disease.

In the 2012 film My Little Hero (released internationally as A Wonderful Moment), Kim played a cynical music director who "discovers" a young boy in an audition contest. He next starred in 2014 legal thriller Punch, where he wowed critics with his portrayal of a prosecutor who is diagnosed with a terminal illness and decides to use his remaining six months to bring down the corrupt officials within the legal system.

This was followed by Gangnam Blues, a 2015 noir action film by director Yoo Ha about the seedy underbelly behind the rapid real estate development of Gangnam in the 1970s. Kim shed 15 kilograms to make his role as a fist-fighting gangster more realistic. He then made his small-screen comeback in the SBS's medical drama Doctors opposite Park Shin-hye. The drama topped viewership ratings and popularity charts during its 10-week broadcast. Following Doctors, Kim experienced a rise in popularity and commercial offers.

In 2017, Kim starred in the crime action film The Prison alongside Han Suk-kyu, playing a former detective behind bars. The film became a surprise hit at the box office and received critical acclaim; and Kim was praised for his realistic execution of action scenes. Kim next starred in mystery thriller film RV: Resurrected Victims by Kwak Kyung-taek. The same year, Kim made his television comeback in fantasy romance drama Black Knight: The Man Who Guards Me.

In September 2018, Kim was cast in the action film Long Live The King alongside Won Jin-ah, based on a webtoon of the same name. Kim will take the role of a mob boss who campaigns and becomes a politician. In 2019, Kim was also cast in the romantic comedy film Crazy Romance alongside Snowman co-star Gong Hyo-jin.

In July 2021, HB Entertainment's contract ended and Kim decided not to renew it.

In 2022, Kim returns to the small screen with SBS drama The First Responders, his first terrestrial television in six years since 2016. In April 2022, it was reported that Kim had formed the Whale Company, an entity Kim founded as a sole agency.

Personal life
On 28 September 2011, Kim was reportedly involved in a physical altercation with a waitress at a bar in Gangnam, Seoul where he and employees of his then-agency Bless Entertainment were drinking. He issued a denial, claiming he had only interceded in a verbal argument between the woman and an agency rep, and later made a public apology regarding the incident.

Kim has long been rumored to come from a very affluent family, which he denied in a 14 January 2013 guest appearance on talk show Healing Camp, though he confirmed that he did inherit an apartment unit during middle school as well as a large sum of money from his grandmother.

Kim is a practicing Roman Catholic.

Filmography

Film

Television series

Awards and nominations

State honors

References

External links 
 

 

South Korean male film actors
South Korean male television actors
South Korean Roman Catholics
1981 births
Living people